Sir Reynold Braybrooke (c.1356-20 September 1405) was an English politician.

Life
Braybrooke was the son of Gerard Braybrooke I and brother of Gerard Braybrooke II. His wife was Joan, daughter of John de la Pole.

Career
In January 1404, Braybrooke was MP for Kent.

Death
Braybrooke died of a battle wound on 20 September 1405. His wife remarried several times; both their sons had predeceased him.

References

1356 births
1405 deaths
14th-century English people
English knights
English MPs January 1404